Carlos Mercader (16 October 1922 – 27 September 2010) was a Uruguayan modern pentathlete. He competed at the 1948 Summer Olympics.

References

1922 births
2010 deaths
Uruguayan male modern pentathletes
Olympic modern pentathletes of Uruguay
Modern pentathletes at the 1948 Summer Olympics
Sportspeople from Montevideo